Charles W. Miller (born August 2, 1939, in Tompkinsville, Kentucky) is an American politician and a Democratic member of the Kentucky House of Representatives representing District 28 since January 1999.

Education
Miller earned his associate degree from Lindsey Wilson College, and his BA and MA from Western Kentucky University.

Career prior to politics

Miller served as the principal of Pleasure Ridge Park High School in southwest Jefferson County, Kentucky from 1978 to 2003.

Elections

1998 When District 28 Republican Representative Bill Lile left the Legislature and left the seat open, Miller was unopposed for the 1998 Democratic Primary and won the November 3, 1998 General election against Republican nominee Doug Hawkins.
2000 Miller was unopposed for the 2000 Democratic Primary and won the November 7, 2000 General election with 10,260 votes (67.1%) against Republican nominee Michael Clontz.
2002 Miller was unopposed for both the 2002 Democratic Primary and also the November 5, 2002 General election, winning with 8,491 votes.
2004 Miller was unopposed for the 2004 Democratic Primary and won the November 2, 2004 General election with 9,108 votes (53.4%) against Republican nominee Ron Gambrell.
2006 Miller unopposed for the 2006 Democratic Primary and won the November 7, 2006 General election with 7,793 votes (63.8%) against Republican nominee John Brewer.
2008 Miller was unopposed for both the 2008 Democratic Primary and the November 4, 2008 General election, winning with 12,859 votes.
2010 Miller and returning 2006 Republican challenger John Brewer both won their May 18, 2010 primaries, setting up a rematch; Miller won the November 2, 2010 General election with 6,874 votes (54.9%) against Brewer.
2012 Miller was unopposed for the May 22, 2012 Democratic Primary and the November 6, 2012 General election, winning with 9,031 votes (56.1%) against Republican nominee Corey Koellner.
2014 Miller was unopposed in both the May 20, 2014 Democratic Primary and the November 4, 2014 general election
2016 Miller was unopposed in the May 17, 2016 Democratic primary and defeated Republican Michael Payne in the November 8, 2016 general election
2018 Miller was unopposed in the May 22, 2018 Democratic Primary and is unopposed in the November 6, 2018 general election

References

External links
Official page at the Kentucky General Assembly

Charles Miller at Ballotpedia
Charles W. Miller at the National Institute on Money in State Politics

1939 births
Living people
Schoolteachers from Kentucky
Democratic Party members of the Kentucky House of Representatives
People from Tompkinsville, Kentucky
Politicians from Louisville, Kentucky
Western Kentucky University alumni
21st-century American politicians